Cramerview is a suburb of Johannesburg, South Africa. It is located in Region B of the City of Johannesburg Metropolitan Municipality.

History
The suburb is situated on part of an old Witwatersrand farm called Driefontein. It was established in 1958 and name after the developers surname, Cramer.

References

Johannesburg Region B